Sarmede is a comune (municipality) in the Province of Treviso in the Italian region Veneto, located about  north of Venice and about  northeast of Treviso.

The village is famous for its frazione, Montaner, because during the 1970s the schism of Montaner occurred under the jurisdiction of the future Pope John Paul I.

Sarmede borders the following municipalities: Caneva, Cappella Maggiore, Cordignano, Fregona.

Demographic evolution

People 
 Štěpán Zavřel (1932–99), painter, graphic artist, fresco creator and writer
 Gianni De Biasi (1956), coach and former player, who served as head coach of Albania national team

References

Cities and towns in Veneto